Gere is a surname. Notable people with the name include:

 Ashlyn Gere (born 1959), stage name of American actress
 Charles March Gere (18691957), English painter, illustrator, stained glass and embroidery designer
 Charlie Gere, British academic of Lancaster University
 David Gere (born 1975), American film producer, actor, artist, business entrepreneur
 François Géré (born 1950), French historian
 Isaac Gere (17641849), American politician
 Olga Gere (born 1942), Yugoslav high jumper
 Richard Gere (born 1949), American actor
 Thomas P. Gere (18421912), Union Army officer in the American Civil War

See also
 Gere (disambiguation)
 Gare (surname)

surnames